Thryogenes is a genus of beetles belonging to the family Brachyceridae.

The species of this genus are found in Europe.

Species:
 Thryogenes atrirostris Lohse, 1992
 Thryogenes festucae (Herbst, 1795)

References

Brachyceridae